The 1951–52 Rugby Football League season was the 57th season of rugby league football.

Season summary

Wigan won their eighth Championship when they beat Bradford Northern 13-6 in the play-off final. Bradford had ended the regular season as the league leaders.

The Challenge Cup Winners were Workington Town who beat Featherstone Rovers 18-10 in the final.

Liverpool Stanley was renamed Liverpool City, and Cardiff, and Doncaster joined the league.

Wigan won the Lancashire League, and Huddersfield won the Yorkshire League. Wigan beat Leigh 14–6 to win the Lancashire Cup, and Wakefield Trinity beat Keighley 17–3 to win the Yorkshire Cup.

Championship
Final standings

Source: wigan.rlfans.com.

League points: for win = 2; for draw = 1; for loss = 0.
Pld = Games played; W = Wins; D = Draws; L = Losses;  Pts = League points.

Play-offs

Challenge Cup

Workington Town beat Featherstone Rovers 18-10 in the Challenge Cup Final played at Wembley Stadium on Saturday 19 April 1952 in front of a crowd of 72,093. Workington full-back and captain-coach Gus Risman became the oldest player to appear in a Cup final at age 41. Three Australians, Tony Paskins, John Mudge and Bevan Wilson came up with decisive plays to help relative newcomers Workington to victory. It was the club's first Cup Final win in their first Final appearance. Billy Ivison, Workington Town's loose forward, was awarded the Lance Todd Trophy for man-of-the-match.

European Championship

This was the twelfth competition and was won for the fourth time by France on points difference.

Results

Final standings

References

Sources
 1951-52 Rugby Football League season at wigan.rlfans.com
 The Challenge Cup at The Rugby Football League website

1951 in English rugby league
1952 in English rugby league
Northern Rugby Football League seasons